UoO may refer to:

 University of Okoboji
 University of Otago
 University of Oxford
 University of Oregon
Uoo may refer to:
 Uoo, Common of Yoo, Yu, Wu, Wi